Sheykh Ahmad (also Romanized as Sheykh Aḩmad; also known as Sheykhaḩmad) is a village in Kushk Rural District, Abezhdan District, Andika County, Khuzestan Province, Iran. At the 2006 census, its population was 46, in 9 families.

References 

Populated places in Andika County